The 2012 United States House of Representatives elections in Kansas were held on Tuesday, November 6, 2012, to elect the four U.S. representatives from the state of Kansas.  The elections coincided with the elections of other federal and state offices, including a quadrennial presidential election.

Overview

Redistricting
The 2010 United States Census reflected a shift of population "primarily from rural western and northern Kansas to urban and suburban areas in the eastern part of the state."

In spite of Republican political control of the governor's office, the state senate, the state house, and the entire U.S. Congressional delegation, redistricting had to be decided by a federal court.  To decide the case, a three-judge panel was appointed by Mary Beck Briscoe, the Chief Judge of the Court of Appeals for the 10th Circuit: Briscoe appointed herself, along with two judges from the District Court for Kansas: Chief District Judge Kathryn Hoefer Vratil, and District Judge John Watson Lungstrum.

According to the Court:
While legislators publicly demurred that they had done the best they could, the impasse
resulted from a bitter ideological feud—largely over new Senate districts. The feud primarily pitted GOP moderates against their more conservative GOP colleagues. Failing consensus, the process degenerated into blatant efforts to gerrymander various districts for ideological political advantage and to serve the political ambitions of various legislators.

Once redistricting was finalized in federal court, primary elections were held on August 7, 2012.

District 1

The redrawn 1st district will continue to encompass all or parts of 62 counties in western and central Kansas, and also taking in a sliver of the Flint Hills region. The district will now also include Pottawatomie and Riley counties, including Manhattan and Kansas State University, but will no longer include Barber, Comanche, Edwards, Kiowa, Pratt, and Stafford counties, and parts of Greenwood, Marshall, Nemaha, and Pawnee counties.

Republican Tim Huelskamp, who has represented the 1st district since 2011, ran for re-election. Huelskamp ran without challengers from any party.

Republican primary

Candidates

Nominee
Tim Huelskamp, incumbent U.S. Representative

Primary results

General election

Endorsements

Results

District 2

The redrawn 2nd district will continue to encompass Allen, Anderson, Atchison, Bourbon, Brown, Cherokee, Coffey, Crawford, Doniphan, Franklin, Jackson, Jefferson, Labette, Leavenworth, Linn, Neosho, Osage, Shawnee, Wilson, and Woodson, and parts of Douglas, Miami, and Nemaha counties. The district will now also include Montgomery County, parts of Marshall County, and the remainder of Douglas and Nemaha counties, but will no longer include Pottawatomie, Riley, and parts of Miami counties. The district lost Kansas State University to the first district, but gained the state's other major college, the University of Kansas.

Republican Lynn Jenkins, who has represented the 2nd district since 2009, is running for re-election.

Dennis Hawver is running as the Libertarian nominee.

Republican primary

Candidates

Nominee
Lynn Jenkins, incumbent U.S. Representative

Democratic primary

Candidates

Nominee
 Tobias Schlingensiepen, a pastor and police chaplain

Eliminated in primary
 Scott Barnhart, farmer and Lawrence attorney 
 Bob Eye, attorney

Primary results

General election

Endorsements

Results

External links
Lynn Jenkins campaign website
Tobias Schlingensiepen campaign website
Jenkins, Schlingensiepen spar in 2nd District forum, The Topeka Capital-Journal, September 30, 2012

District 3

The redrawn 3rd district will continue to encompass Johnson and Wyandotte counties. The district will now also include the northeastern part of Miami County, but will no longer include the eastern part of Douglas County.

Republican Kevin Yoder, who has represented the 3rd district since 2011, is running for re-election. Joel Balam, a college professor, ran as the Libertarian nominee. Even though he lost, Balam's 31.5% set a new record for the highest percentage a Libertarian candidate ever received in any U.S. House election, mostly because Yoder had no Democratic opponent running against him.

Republican primary

Candidates

Nominee
Kevin Yoder, incumbent U.S. Representative

Primary results

General election

Endorsements

Results

District 4

The redrawn 4th district will continue to encompass Butler, Chautauqua, Cowley, Elk, Harper, Harvey, Kingman, Sedgwick, and Sumner counties, as well as the southern part of Greenwood county. The district will now also include Barber, Comanche, Edwards, Kiowa, Pratt, and Stafford counties, the remainder of Greenwood County, and the southwestern part of Pawnee County, but will no longer include Montgomery County.

Republican Mike Pompeo, who has represented the 4th district since 2011, is running for re-election. 
Thomas Jefferson, a computer technician formerly known as Jack Talbert, is running as the Libertarian nominee.

Republican primary

Candidates

Nominee
Mike Pompeo, incumbent U.S. Representative

Primary results

Democratic primary

Candidates

Nominee
 Robert Tillman, retired court officer and candidate for this seat in 2010

Eliminated in primary
 Esau Freeman, painter

Primary results

General election

Endorsements

Results

References

External links
 Robyn Renee Essex v. Kris W. Kobach, Kansas Secretary of State from the U.S. District Court for Kansas
United States House of Representatives elections in Kansas, 2012 at Ballotpedia
Kansas U.S. House at OurCampaigns.com
Campaign contributions for U.S. Congressional races in Kansas at OpenSecrets
Outside spending at the Sunlight Foundation

Kansas
2012
United States House of Representatives